Arthur Kenyon (1 December 1867 – 1895) was an English footballer who played in the Football League for Darwen.

References

1872 births
1949 deaths
English footballers
Association football goalkeepers
English Football League players
Birmingham St George's F.C. players
Darwen F.C. players